This is a list of seasons of Växjö Lakers HC, a Swedish ice hockey club based in Växjö.

External links
 Swedish Ice Hockey Association: Historical Statistics
 Swedish Ice Hockey Association: Current Statistics
 Eliteprospects.com: Club profile

Växjö Lakers